Akshiganga is a small town in the West Siang district in the Indian state of Arunachal Pradesh.

West Siang district